Sweeter than Bourbon is the debut studio album by Irish band Seneca.

Track listing
All songs written by Robert Hope, performed by Seneca.

References

2008 albums
Senakah albums